Gastrochaenolites is a trace fossil formed as a clavate (club-shaped) boring in a hard substrate such as a shell, rock or carbonate hardground. The aperture of the boring is narrower than the main chamber and may be circular, oval, or dumb-bell shaped (Kelly and Bromley, 1984). Gastrochaenolites is most commonly attributed to bioeroding bivalves such as Lithophaga and Gastrochaena (Kleeman, 1980). The fossil ranges from the Ordovician to the Recent (Taylor and Wilson, 2003; Vinn and Wilson, 2010). The first Lower Jurassic Gastrochaenolites ichnospecies is Gastrochaenolites messisbugi Bassi, Posenato, Nebelsick, 2017. This is the first record of boreholes and their producers (mytilid bivalves) in one of the larger bivalves of the globally occurring Lithiotis fauna which is a unique facies in the Lower Jurassic Tethys and Panthalassa.

References

External links 

 Gastrochaenolites systematics and diagrams (in German).

Boring fossils